Mandi Road is a village in Bhulath in Kapurthala district of Punjab State, India. The village is administrated by Sarpanch an elected representative of the village.

Demography 
, The village has a total of 73 houses and a population of 353, including 170 males and 183 females.  According to the report published by Census India in 2011, out of the total population of the village, 37 people are from Schedule Caste and the village does not have a Schedule Tribe population.

See also
List of villages in India

References

External links 
 Tourism of Punjab
 Census of Punjab

Villages in Kapurthala district